Selim is an ethnic group of Sudan. They speak Sudanese Arabic. 
Most members of this ethnic groups are Muslims. The population of this ethnic group is at several 10,000.

References
Joshua Project

Ethnic groups in Sudan